Ekrem Celil (born February 20, 1980 in Kardzhali, Bulgaria) is a Turkish European champion weightlifter competing in the –69 kg and –77 kg divisions.

Born in Bulgaria of Turkish descent, he started to perform weightlifting in a local club. Ekrem Celil immigrated in 1998 to Turkey in an action called as the "second Naim operation".

He was admitted in 2000 to the Turkish national team, which would take part at the Olympics in Sydney. However, the Bulgarian Federation vetoed his participation.

Achievements
European Weightlifting Championships

Mediterranean Games

Tournaments

References

External links
Ekrem Celil at Database Weightlifting

Living people
1980 births
Bulgarian Turks in Turkey
Turkish male weightlifters
People from Kardzhali
European champions in weightlifting
European champions for Turkey
Mediterranean Games gold medalists for Turkey
Mediterranean Games medalists in weightlifting
Competitors at the 2005 Mediterranean Games
European Weightlifting Championships medalists